Downton was a railway station serving Downton, a village in Wiltshire. The village contained a large tanning mill on the River Avon, which has now closed, and has been redeveloped as residential property. The station was one of many casualties of the mass closure of British railway lines in the 1960s and 1970s; the last service was on 2 May 1964. It was served by the Salisbury and Dorset Junction Railway, a line running north–south, along the River Avon just to the West of the New Forest, connecting Salisbury to the North and Poole to the South, meeting the Southampton and Dorchester Railway at West Moors.

Today, the site of the station is a residential estate.

External links
Downton Station at Subterranea Britannica

Further reading

  

Disused railway stations in Wiltshire
Railway stations in Great Britain opened in 1866
Railway stations in Great Britain closed in 1964
Beeching closures in England
1866 establishments in England
Former London and South Western Railway stations